The Uganda Film Festival Awards also known as UFF Awards, are presented annually to recognize excellence in the film Industry in Uganda. The awards started in 2013 under a Uganda Communications Commission initiative to recognize and develop the Ugandan film industry. Nominated films are screened at a five-day festival that also runs training, workshops, exhibitions and outreaches. The awarding night marks the helm of the film festival that runs for three days.

Award categories
Categories for television were introduced in 2016 while film categories started with the awards in 2013. The following is the list of categories awarded by the Uganda Film Festival Awards as of 2019.

Records

Most nominations per year

By a film

Television

Most wins per year

By a film

Television

References

External links
THE UGANDA FILM FERSTIVAL STRUCTURE

Ugandan film awards
Ugandan television awards
Awards established in 2013
2013 establishments in Uganda